Ilyas Ismayilli (Azeri: İsmayıllı İlyas İsmiyar oğlu Sumgait, Azerbaijan March 10, 1989) has served as the president of the Association of Scouts of Azerbaijan since 24 December 2012. Since 2006, he had served as Assistant Commissioner of the Association of Scouts of Azerbaijan.

Ismayilli served in the Azerbaijani Armed Forces until 2010, then studied Commercial Law and graduated with honors from the law faculty of Baku State University in 2012. He has worked for Deloitte and lives in Baku, Azerbaijan.

Ismayilli will serve as the Operations Senior Manager for the Athletes Villages of the Baku 2017, the 4th Islamic Solidarity Games; as well as Chairman of the Host Committee of the 41st World Scout Conference and 13th World Scout Youth Forum, to be held in Baku in 2017.

References

External links

http://euroscoutinfo.com/tag/wosm/
http://www.muallim.edu.az/arxiv/2014/07/24.htm 
https://www.youtube.com/watch?v=8M9Zyqq9e3M Treasures from a Backpack: Ilyas Ismayilli, president of Association of Scouts of Azerbaijan
https://scout.org/user/3003?language=en
https://prezi.com/i0wdi1dualpv/presentation/ Организационное строительство и коммуникации by Ilyas Ismayilli    25,11,2014

1989 births
Living people
Scouting and Guiding in Azerbaijan
People from Sumgait